Harrison Theodore Paton (born May 23, 1998) is a Canadian soccer player who most recently played as a midfielder for Scottish Premiership club Ross County. He made his debut for Ross County against Alloa in the Scottish League Cup, where he also scored his first goal for the club.

Club career
After helping Stenhousemuir gain promotion to League One in the 2017-18 season on loan from Hearts, Paton would sign a one year deal with Scottish Championship side Ross County in July 2018. In his first season with Ross County, Paton would spend the first half of the season back on loan with Stenhousemuir, but would return from loan in January, and would make 7 appearances for the club. Ross County would re-sign Paton for the 2019-20 season, and he would make his first start for the club in September 2019. Paton would make 23 appearances for the club in 2019-20, breaking into the first team on a full-time basis. On May 25, 2020 Ross County announced Paton had signed a new deal with the club. In June 2022 it was announced that Paton had turned down a new contract offer with the club, ending his time at Ross County after four seasons.

International career

Youth
Paton was part of the Canada U17 team who participated in the 2015 CONCACAF U-17 Championship where Paton played 6 times. He would be named to Canada's provisional squad for the 2020 CONCACAF Men's Olympic Qualifying Championship in February 2020. Paton was set to be named to the team ahead of the re-scheduled tournament in March 2021, but Ross County opted to not release him.

Senior
In June 2021 Paton was named to Canada's 60-man preliminary squad for the 2021 CONCACAF Gold Cup. On July 1 he was named to the final 23-man squad. However he did not make an appearance for Canada in 2021.

Personal life
Paton's younger brother, Ben, is also a professional soccer player. 

In Late 2021, Paton was accused of domestic abuse by his ex-partner. In May 2022, his trial was deferred. In January 2023, the charges were dropped.

Career statistics

Club

Honours

Club
Ross County
Scottish Championship: 2018–19
Scottish Challenge Cup: 2018–19

References

External links
 

1998 births
Living people
Association football midfielders
Canada men's youth international soccer players
Canadian soccer players
Heart of Midlothian F.C. players
Ross County F.C. players
Scottish Professional Football League players
Stenhousemuir F.C. players
Soccer people from Ontario
Sportspeople from Kitchener, Ontario
Canadian expatriate soccer players
Canadian expatriate sportspeople in Scotland
2021 CONCACAF Gold Cup players